"Um, Um, Um, Um, Um, Um" is a song, written by Curtis Mayfield.

Overview
The first recording to be released was by Major Lance, as a single in December 1963, produced by Okeh label president Carl Davis.

Chart performance
The song was Major Lance's third release to make the Billboard Hot 100 and his most successful hit with a #5 peak on the Billboard Hot 100 on 8 February 1964 with a #1 peak on the Cash Box R&B chart (Billboard did not run an R&B chart November 1963-January 1965). In the UK it reached #40, Lance's only UK chart appearance.

Other versions
The song became a major hit in the UK during the autumn of 1964 with a rendition by Wayne Fontana and the Mindbenders reaching No. 5.
Johnny Rivers covered the song for his 1977 album Outside Help from which it was issued as the follow-up single to the top ten hit "Swayin' to the Music (Slow Dancing)". Rivers' version was renamed "Curious Mind" after a lyric in the second verse; the full title of the Rivers' version being "Curious Mind (Um, Um, Um, Um, Um, Um)". "Curious Mind..." was heavily supported by easy-listening radio, peaking at No. 4 on the Easy Listening chart in Billboard in February 1978; it reached No. 41 on the Billboard Hot 100 where it was Rivers' final charting song.

References

1963 singles
Songs written by Curtis Mayfield
Major Lance songs
The Mindbenders songs
Johnny Rivers songs
1963 songs
1965 singles
1978 singles
Big Tree Records singles